The People's Republic of China Travel Document is a type of travel document issued by Chinese embassies, consulates, and other foreign offices to Chinese citizens for their international travel to China and other countries. The bearer of the Travel Document is legally a Chinese citizen in accordance with the Nationality Law.

Eligibility 
The People's Republic of China Travel Document is issued by the Chinese diplomatic representative offices, consular offices and other foreign offices to the following persons:

 Residents of Hong Kong, Macao and Taiwan with Chinese citizenship who do not hold the Mainland Travel Permit for Hong Kong and Macau Residents or the Mainland Travel Permit for Taiwan Residents and need to return to the Mainland; 
 Taiwanese residents, with Chinese citizenship, who cannot apply for foreign visas with Taiwanese travel documents;
 Chinese citizens who are too late to apply for passports due to emergencies.

Chinese citizens who are born abroad may apply for the Travel Documents. They may instead directly apply for Chinese Passports if their countries of birth do not offer birthright citizenship.

Types 
There are two types of Travel Documents, which are respectively valid for single entry for one year and valid for multiple entries for two years. The former type only allows the bearer to enter and exit China once; the latter can travel to and from China multiple times within two years. If the bearer acquires a visa to a third country, they may travel to the third country. If the single-entry Travel Document is marked with "Valid for return to home country only", the Travel Document will be invalid after the bearer returns. Travel Documents may not be extended.

Application requirements 
The applicant shall approach any of the Chinese embassies, consulates, and other foreign offices in person to file the application. The application fee is lowered to US$18 or the equivalent in local currency starting from July 1, 2019, in accordance to a new fee standard proved by the Ministry of Finance. Previously, starting on October 8, 2013, the application fee was $35 or the equivalent in local currency.

Events 
After Iraq invaded Kuwait in 1990, the Chinese Embassy in Iraq organized an emergency evacuation of Mainland China, Taiwan, Hong Kong, and Macao personnel stranded in Iraq and Kuwait. The Iraqi government required the Chinese embassy to confirm the identity of these personnel. Because it was impossible for the Chinese embassy to stamp on the passports issued by Taiwan for confirmation, the Chinese embassy issued one-time People's Republic of China Travel Documents to these Taiwan residents and evacuated them to Jordan by land.

Visa-free access

References

See also 
 Chinese passport
 People's Republic of China passport
 Hong Kong Special Administrative Region passport
 Macao Special Administrative Region passport
 Travel document
 Taiwan passport

Cross-Strait relations
International travel documents
Identity documents